Ibrahim Böhme (18 November 1944 in Bad Dürrenberg, Province of Saxony – 22 November 1999) was an East German politician and Stasi informer.  Before becoming involved in politics, Böhme had worked numerous different jobs, including as a cook, waiter, bricklayer, teacher, and historian.  In the late 1980s he is also known to have been a human rights advocate associated with the Initiative for Peace and Human Rights.

He was a cofounder of the Social Democratic Party in the GDR in October 1989, and was elected its first full-time chairman at the party's first regular congress in January 1990. He led the party to second place in East Germany's first and only free election, on 18 March 1990, and was slated to be a senior minister in the grand coalition led by Lothar de Maizière. 

While coalition talks were underway, the weekly magazine Der Spiegel reported on 24 March 1990 that Böhme had been an informer for the Stasi since 1969. He had infiltrated opposition circles in East Berlin in 1985. Although Böhme denied this, he was forced to resign on 1 April. He was expelled from the Social Democratic Party in 1992 for "serious party-damaging behavior". Böhme was one of many East German citizens to have been discovered to be Stasi informants during the Communist era, sometimes ruining personal relationships as well as careers.

Ibrahim Böhme died of heart complications in Berlin on 22 November 1999 at the age of 55.  He denied the accusations of him being a Stasi informer up to his death.

Notes

References
Biography: Ibrahim Bohme, 1944-1999 
dhm.de
Ibrahim Böhme (IM "Maximilian")
Chronikderwende: Ibrahim Bohme

External links

1944 births
1999 deaths
People from Saalekreis
People from the Province of Saxony
Socialist Unity Party of Germany politicians
Social Democratic Party of Germany politicians
Members of the 10th Volkskammer
People of the Stasi
Social Democratic Party in the GDR politicians